Chris Menninga (born October 21, 1974 in Austin, Texas), is a retired racecar driver who has raced in open wheel racing.

Menninga started in the Barber Dodge Pro Series where he raced from 1995 to 1997, winning a race and finishing fourth in points his final year. He then moved to Indy Lights driving for Conquest Racing in 1999 finishing 14th in points. He returned to the team and series in 2000 and finished 9th in points with a best finish of 4th at the Milwaukee Mile. In 2001 he competed in three late-season IRL IndyCar Series races for Hemelgarn Racing, dropping out of two before the finish and finishing 16th at Chicagoland Speedway. In 2005 he competed in one Toyota Atlantic race at Road America for ArmsUp Motorsports.

He was later a spotter for Conquest Racing in the Champ Car series.

He lives in Des Moines, Iowa.

IRL IndyCar Series

References

1974 births
Living people
IndyCar Series drivers
Indy Lights drivers
Atlantic Championship drivers
Racing drivers from Austin, Texas
Racing drivers from Texas
Sportspeople from Austin, Texas
Barber Pro Series drivers

Conquest Racing drivers